(Rome Sport Association), commonly referred to as Roma, is a professional football club based in Rome, Italy. Founded by a merger in 1927, Roma has participated in the top tier of Italian football for all of its existence, except for the 1951–52 season. Roma has won Serie A three times, in 1941–42, 1982–83 and 2000–01, as well as nine  titles and two  titles. In European competitions, Roma won the UEFA Europa Conference League in 2021–22, the Inter-Cities Fairs Cup in 1960–61 and was runner-up in the 1983–84 European Cup and the 1990–91 UEFA Cup.

Sixteen players have won the FIFA World Cup while playing at Roma: Attilio Ferraris and Enrique Guaita (1934); Guido Masetti and Eraldo Monzeglio (1934 and 1938); Aldo Donati and Pietro Serantoni (1938); Bruno Conti (1982); Rudi Völler and Thomas Berthold (1990); Aldair (1994); Vincent Candela (1998); Cafu (2002); Daniele De Rossi, Simone Perrotta and Francesco Totti (2006); Paulo Dybala (2022).

Since 1953, Roma has played home matches at the Stadio Olimpico, a venue the club shares with city rivals Lazio. With a capacity of over 72,000, the stadium is the second-largest of its kind in Italy, with only the San Siro able to seat more. The club plans to move to a new stadium, though it is yet to start construction. Having a strong local rivalry, Roma and Lazio contest the Derby della Capitale.

The club's home colours are carmine red and golden yellow, which gives Roma its nickname "I Giallorossi" ("The Yellow and Reds"). These colours have often been combined with white shorts. The club badge features a she-wolf, an allusion to the founding myth of Rome.

History

Foundation

A.S. Roma was founded in the spring of 1927 when Italo Foschi initiated the merger of three older Italian Football Championship clubs from the city of Rome: Roman FC, SS Alba-Audace and Fortitudo-Pro Roma SGS. Foschi was an important Roman representative of the ruling National Fascist Party.

The purpose of the merger was to give the Italian capital a strong club to rival that of the more dominant Northern Italian clubs of the time. The only major Roman club to resist the merger was Lazio because of the intervention of the army General Vaccaro, a member of the club and executive of Italian Football Federation (FIGC).
The club played its earliest seasons at the Motovelodromo Appio stadium, before settling in the working-class streets of Testaccio, where it built an all-wooden ground Campo Testaccio; this was opened in November 1929. An early season in which Roma made a large mark was the 1930–31 championship, where the club finished as runners-up behind . Captain Attilio Ferraris, along with Guido Masetti, Fulvio Bernardini and Rodolfo Volk, were highly important players during this period.

First title victory and decline

After a slump in league form and the departure of high key players, Roma eventually rebuilt their squad, adding goalscorers such as the Argentine Enrique Guaita. Under the management of Luigi Barbesino, the Roman club came close to their first title in 1935–36, finishing just one point behind champions Bologna.

Roma returned to form after being inconsistent for much of the late 1930s. Roma recorded an unexpected title triumph in the 1941–42 season by winning their first  title. The 18 goals scored by local player Amedeo Amadei were essential to the Alfréd Schaffer-coached Roma side winning the title. At the time, Italy was involved in World War II and Roma were playing at the Stadio Nazionale PNF.

In the years just after the war, Roma were unable to recapture their league stature from the early 1940s. Roma finished in the lower half of Serie A for five seasons in a row, before eventually succumbing to their only ever relegation to Serie B at the end of the 1950–51 season, around a decade after their championship victory. Under future Italy national team manager Giuseppe Viani, promotion straight back up was achieved.

After returning to the Serie A, Roma managed to stabilise themselves as a top-half club again with players such as Egisto Pandolfini, Dino da Costa and Dane Helge Bronée. Their best finish of this period was under the management of Englishman Jesse Carver, when in 1954–55, they finished as runners-up after Udinese, who originally finished second, were relegated for corruption. Although Roma were unable to break into the top four during the following decade, they did achieve some measure of cup success. Their first honour outside of Italy was recorded in 1960–61 when Roma won the Inter-Cities Fairs Cup by defeating Birmingham City 4–2 in the finals. A few years later, Roma won their first Coppa Italia trophy in 1963–64 after defeating Torino 1–0.

Their lowest point came during the 1964–65 season, when manager Juan Carlos Lorenzo announced the club could not pay its players and was unlikely to be able to afford to travel to Vicenza to fulfil its next fixture. Supporters kept the club going with a fundraiser at the Sistine Theatre and bankruptcy was avoided with the election of a new club president Franco Evangelisti.

Their second Coppa Italia trophy was won in 1968–69, when it competed in a small, league-like system. Giacomo Losi set a Roma appearance record in 1969 with 450 appearances in all competitions, a record that would last 38 years.

Time of mixed fortunes from the 1970s to the 1990s

Roma were able to add another cup to their collection in 1972, with a 3–1 victory over Blackpool in the Anglo-Italian Cup. During much of the 1970s, Roma's appearance in the top half of Serie A was sporadic. The best place the club were able to achieve during the decade was third in 1974–75. Notable players who turned out for the club during this period included midfielders Giancarlo De Sisti and Francesco Rocca.

The dawning of a newly successful era in Roma's footballing history was brought in with another Coppa Italia victory; they defeated Torino on penalties to win the 1979–80 edition. Former Milan player Nils Liedholm was the manager at the time, with players such as Bruno Conti, Agostino Di Bartolomei, Roberto Pruzzo and Falcão.

The second scudetto did not elude Roma for much longer. In 1982–83, the Roman club won the title for the first time in 41 years, amidst celebrations in the capital. The following season, Roma finished as runners-up in Italy and collected a Coppa Italia title; they also finished as runners-up in the European Cup final of 1984. The European Cup final with Liverpool ended in a 1–1 draw with a goal from Pruzzo, but Roma eventually lost in the penalty shoot-out. Roma's successful run in the 1980s would finish with a runners-up spot in 1985–86 and a Coppa Italia victory, beating out Sampdoria 3–2.

After, a comparative decline began in the league, one of the few league highs from the following period being a third-place finish in 1987–88. The same season, the club won its seventh Coppa Italia and ended runners-up to Sampdoria in the Supercoppa Italiana. Aside from finishing runners-up to Torino in a Coppa Italia final, the rest of the decade was largely sub-par in the history of Roma, particularly in the league, where the highest they could manage was fourth in 1997–98. The early 1990s also saw the emergence of homegrown striker Francesco Totti, who would go on to be an important member of the team and the club's iconic captain.

Third scudetto in the Sensi era

Roma won their third Serie A title in 2000–01. The Scudetto was won on the last day of the season after defeating Parma 3–1, edging Juventus by two points. The club's captain, Francesco Totti, was a large reason for the title victory and he would become one of the main heroes in the club's history, going on to break several club records. Other important players during this period included: Aldair, Cafu, Gabriel Batistuta and Vincenzo Montella.

In the 2001–02 Serie A, Roma ended as runners-up to Juventus by one point. This would be the start of Roma finishing as runners-up several times in both Serie A and Coppa Italia during the 2000s – they lost out 4–2 to Milan in the Coppa Italia final of 2003 and lost to Milan again by finishing second in Serie A for the 2003–04 season. The club also re-capitalized several time in 2003–04 season. In November 2003, €37.5 million was injected by "Roma 2000" to cover the half-year loss and loss carried from previous year. and again on 30 June for €44.57 million. Through stock market, a further €19.850 million of new shares issued, and at the year end, the share capital was €19.878 million, which was unchanged . The following season also saw the departure of Walter Samuel for €25 million and Emerson for €28 million, which decreased the strength of the squad. The Giallorossi finished in eighth place, one of the worst of recent seasons.

On 9 July 2006, Roma's Francesco Totti, Daniele De Rossi and Simone Perrotta were part of the Italy national team which defeated France in the 2006 FIFA World Cup Final. In the Calciopoli scandal of 2006, Roma were not one of the teams involved. After punishments were issued, Roma was re-classified as runners-up for 2005–06, the same season they finished second in the Coppa Italia losing to Internazionale. In the two following seasons, 2006–07 and 2007–08, Roma finished as Serie A runners-up, meaning that in the 2000s, Roma finished in the top two positions more than any other decade in their history. Meanwhile, in the UEFA Champions League during both of these seasons, they reached the quarter-finals before going out to Manchester United. In the 2008–09 Champions League, Roma reached the knockout stage ahead of Chelsea in their group, thus finishing for the first time in their history as winners of the group stage. However, they lost to Arsenal in the knockout stage on penalty kicks.

After a disappointing start to the 2009–10 season, Claudio Ranieri replaced Luciano Spalletti as head coach. At the time of the switch, Roma lay bottom of the Serie A table after losses to Juventus and Genoa. Despite this setback, Roma went on unbeaten streak of 24 matches in the league – with the last of the 24 being a 2–1 win over rivals Lazio, whereby they came from 1–0 down at half-time to defeat their city rivals after Ranieri substituted both Totti and De Rossi at the interval. The Giallorossi were on top of the table at one point, before a loss to Sampdoria later in the season. Roma would finish runners-up to Internazionale yet again in both Serie A and the Coppa Italia. During the 2000s, Roma had finally recaptured the Scudetto, two Coppa Italia trophies, and their first two Supercoppa Italiana titles. Other notable contributions to the club's history have included a return to the Champions League quarter-finals (in the 2006–07 and 2007–08 editions) since 1984, six runners up positions in the league, four Coppa Italia finals and three Supercoppa finals – marking Roma's greatest ever decade.

American ownership and Pallotta era
In the summer of 2010, the Sensi family agreed to relinquish their control of Roma as part of a debt-settlement agreement, ending their reign that had begun in 1993. Until a new owner was appointed, Rosella Sensi continued her directorial role of the club. Following a series of poor results that saw Roma engage in a winless streak of five consecutive matches, Claudio Ranieri resigned as head coach in February 2011, and former striker Vincenzo Montella was appointed as caretaker manager until the end of the season. It was also during this season that Roma icon Francesco Totti scored his 200th Serie A goal against Fiorentina in March 2011, becoming only the sixth player to achieve such a feat.

On 16 April 2011, the takeover contract was closed with an American investment group led by Thomas R. DiBenedetto, with James Pallotta, Michael Ruane and Richard D'Amore as partners. DiBenedetto became the 22nd president of the club, serving from 27 September 2011 to 27 August 2012 and was succeeded by Pallotta. The new intermediate holding company, NEEP Roma Holding, was 60% owned by American's "AS Roma SPV, LLC" and the rest (40%) was retained by the creditor of Sensi, UniCredit. In turn, NEEP owned all shares held previously by Sensi (about 67%) with the rest free float in the stock market. UniCredit later disinvested NEEP Roma Holding to sell to "AS Roma SPV, LLC" and Pallotta.

The new ownership hired Walter Sabatini as director of football and former Spanish international and Barcelona B coach Luis Enrique as manager. Signings included attacking midfielder Erik Lamela from River Plate and forward Bojan from Barcelona, as well as Dani Osvaldo and Miralem Pjanić. On the pitch, the team were eliminated from 2011–12 UEFA Europa League play-off round by Slovan Bratislava. In 2012, Pallotta became the new president. The 2012–13 pre-season started with the hiring of former manager Zdeněk Zeman. He was sacked on 2 February 2013, while the team ended up in sixth place in Serie A, and lost 1–0 to rivals Lazio in the Coppa Italia final. It was the first time that Lazio and Roma clashed in the Coppa Italia final. As a result, Roma missed out on European competition for the second-straight season.

On 12 June 2013, Rudi Garcia was appointed the new manager of Roma. He won his first ten matches (an all-time Serie A record) including a 2–0 derby win against Lazio, a 3–0 victory away to Internazionale and a 2–0 home win over title rivals Napoli. During this run, Roma scored 24 times while conceding just once, away to Parma. The club earned 85 points and finished second to Juventus, who won the league with a record-breaking 102 points. In 2014–15, Roma finished second behind Juventus for the second consecutive season after a poor run of form in 2015. At the end of season, the club was sanctioned for loss making and breaking UEFA Financial Fair Play Regulations, being punished with a fine of up to €6 million and a limited squad for UEFA competitions.

Ahead of the 2015–16 season, Roma acquired Bosnia international, Edin Džeko, from Manchester City on a €4 million loan with an €11 million option to buy clause, which was activated. On 13 January 2016, Garcia was sacked after a run of one win in seven Serie A matches. Luciano Spalletti was subsequently appointed manager of Roma for his second spell. On 21 February, Totti publicly criticised Spalletti due to his own lack of playing-time since returning from injury. Consequently, Totti was subsequently dropped by Spalletti for Roma's 5–0 win over Palermo, with the decision causing an uproar among the fans and in the media. After their initial disagreements, Spalletti began to use Totti as an immediate impact substitute, and he contributed with four goals and one assist after coming off the bench in five consecutive Serie A matches. Spalletti was able to lead Roma from a mid-table spot to a third-place finish in Serie A, clinching the UEFA Champions League play-off spot.

During the summer of 2016, Roma lost midfielder Miralem Pjanić to rivals Juventus to improve its financial position. On 27 April 2017, Roma appointed sporting director Monchi, formerly of Sevilla FC. On 28 May that year, on the last day of the 2016–17 season, Totti made his 786th and final appearance for Roma before retiring in a 3–2 home win against Genoa, coming on as a substitute for Mohamed Salah in the 54th minute and received a standing ovation from the fans. The win saw Roma finish second in Serie A behind Juventus. Daniele De Rossi succeeded Totti as club captain and signed a new two-year contract.

On 13 June 2017, former Roma player Eusebio Di Francesco was appointed as the club's new manager, replacing Spalletti, who had left for Internazionale. Roma again lost a key player during the summer transfer window, with Mohamed Salah joining Liverpool F.C. for a fee of €39 million (£34m). Several new players joined the club, including a club-record deal of up to €40 million for Sampdoria striker Patrik Schick. In the 2017–18 UEFA Champions League Roma were drawn against FC Barcelona in the quarter-finals, being defeated 4–1 away in the first leg but winning 3–0 in the second to advance on away goals to the semi-finals for the first time since 1984. Roma then lost to Liverpool, the team that had defeated them in the 1984 European Cup Final 7–6 on aggregate. Roma ended the 2017–18 season in 3rd place on 77 points, qualifying for the following season's Champions League.

In the summer of 2018, Roma were busy in the transfer market, in large parts thanks to the €83 million they received from reaching the Champions League semi finals, as well as selling goalkeeper Alisson Becker for a world record €72 million including bonuses to Liverpool. Roma spent €150 million to sign the likes of Shick, Nzonzi, Pastore, Kluivert, Defrel and more, while selling their two starting midfielders from the previous season, Nainggolan and Strootman. The 2018-19 season saw the club eliminated against Porto 4–3 on aggregate in the Champions League round of 16; Di Francesco was sacked and replaced by Claudio Ranieri who served as caretaker manager. The following day, sporting director Monchi stepped down due to disagreements with Pallotta; the club president disputed his account In Monchi's two years at the club, he spent £208 million on 21 signings, while when he left, 12 of his signings remained at the club. Under Ranieri, Roma failed to qualify for the Champions League, finishing 6th.

Friedkin era and European success
In December 2019, AS Roma SPV LLC was in final negotiations to sell the team for $872 million, to American businessman Dan Friedkin, however negotiations stalled during the COVID-19 pandemic. On 6 August 2020, Friedkin signed the preliminary contract to agree to pay $591 million to Pallotta, the main shareholder of Roma.

Paulo Fonseca, who was  hired as manager in 2019, left two years later and was replaced by fellow Portuguese José Mourinho. On 25 May 2022, he led Roma to win the inaugural edition of UEFA Europa Conference League, defeating Feyenoord in the final.

Colours, kits, crests and nicknames
Roma's colours of carmine red with a golden yellow trim represents the traditional colours of Rome, the official seal of the Comune di Roma features the same colours. The gold and the purple-red represent Roman imperial dignity. White shorts and black socks are usually worn with the red shirt.  However, in particularly high key matches, the shorts and socks are the same colour as the home shirt.

The kit itself was originally worn by Roman Football Club; one of the three clubs who merged to form the current incarnation in 1927. Because of the colours they wear, Roma are often nicknamed i giallorossi meaning the yellow-reds. Roma's away kit is traditionally white, with a third kit changing colour from time to time.

A popular nickname for the club is "i lupi" ("the wolves") – the animal has always featured on the club's badge in different forms throughout their history. The emblem of the team is currently the one which was used when the club was first founded. It portrays the female wolf with the two infant brothers Romulus and Remus, illustrating the myth of the founding of Rome, superimposed on a bipartite golden yellow over a maroon red shield. In the myth from which the club takes their nickname and logo, the twins (sons of Mars and Rhea Silvia) are thrown into the river Tiber by their uncle Amulius. A she-wolf then saved the twins and looked after them. Eventually, the two twins took revenge on Amulius before falling out themselves – Romulus killed Remus and was thus made king of a new city named in his honour, Rome.

Kit suppliers and shirt sponsors

Facilities

Stadiums

The first sport facility Roma used was the Motovelodromo Appio, previously used by Alba-Audace. Roma only played the 1927–28 season there until they moved to Campo Testaccio the very next season. Campo Testaccio was used through 1929 to 1940. The team moved later to the Stadio Nazionale del PNF, where they spent 13 years before moving once again.

In the 1953–54 season, Roma moved to the Olympic arena, Stadio Olimpico, which it shares with Lazio. The arena has undergone several changes over the years. The most significant change took place in the nineties when Stadio Olimpico was demolished and then reconstructed for the 1990 FIFA World Cup, held in Italy. Roma have played almost every season since 1953–54, with exception of the 1989–90 seasons due to the reconstruction of Stadio Olimpico. That year, Roma played its home matches at Stadio Flaminio.

On 30 December 2012, Roma club president James Pallotta announced the construction of a new stadium in the Tor di Valle area of Rome. The new stadium, Stadio della Roma, will have a capacity of 52,500 spectators. On 2 February 2017, the Region of Lazio and the mayor of Rome rejected the proposal to build a new stadium. However, it was later approved on 24 February after final review of the stadium's design adjustments. In August 2017, the stadium suffered another delay, forcing Roma to renew their lease with the Stadio Olimpico until 2020. It is presently uncertain when the stadium will open. On 5 December 2017 the Stadio della Roma project, after experiencing five years worth of delays due to conflicting interests from various parties in the Roman city government, was given the go-ahead to begin construction, with the stadium expected to be ready to open for the 2020–21 season. On 26 February 2021, it was announced that the stadium project was halted.

List of stadiums used by the club
1927–1928 Motovelodromo Appio
1929–1940 Campo Testaccio
1940–1953 Stadio Nazionale del PNF
1953– Stadio Olimpico (1989–1990 Stadio Flaminio due to renovations on Olimpico)

Trigoria
A sports centre located in Trigoria at kilometre 3600 in south-east of Rome was purchased on 22 July 1977 by then club president Gaetano Anzalone. It was opened on 23 July 1979 as Anzalone's final act as president. The complex had its first expansion in 1984 when the club was handled by Dino Viola and another in 1998 under the chairmanship of Franco Sensi. The centre's official name is the Fulvio Bernardini di Trigoria, named after club icon Fulvio Bernardini.

On 4 September 2019, the Trigoria training ground began to serve also as a private school named 'Liceo Scientifico Sportivo A.S. Roma' exclusively educating only the team's youth players in a renovated building on the training ground premises. 80 students are currently enrolled in the school which features its own cafeteria and gym.

The centre is also known for hosting the Argentina national team during the 1990 FIFA World Cup, held in Italy.

Supporters

Roma is the fifth-most supported football club in Italy – behind Juventus, Internazionale, A.C. Milan and Napoli – with approximately 7% of Italian football fans supporting the club, according to the Doxa Institute-L'Espresso's research of April 2006. Historically, the largest section of Roma supporters in the city of Rome have come from the inner-city, especially Testaccio.

The traditional ultras group of the club was Commando Ultrà Curva Sud commonly abbreviated as CUCS. This group was founded by the merger of many smaller groups and was considered one of the most historic in the history of European football. However, by the mid-1990s, CUCS had been usurped by rival factions and ultimately broke up. Since that time, the Curva Sud of the Stadio Olimpico has been controlled by more right-wing groups, including A.S. Roma Ultras, Boys and Giovinezza, among others. However, the oldest group, Fedayn, is apolitical, and politics is not the main identity of Roma, just a part of their overall identity. Besides ultras groups, it is believed Roma fans support the left as opposed to Lazio supporters, which are notoriously proud of their right-wing affiliation.

In November 2015, Roma's ultras and their Lazio counterparts boycotted Roma's 1–0 victory in the Derby della Capitale in protest at new safety measures imposed at the Stadio Olimpico. The measures – imposed by Rome's prefect, Franco Gabrielli – had involved plastic glass dividing walls being installed in both the Curva Sud and Curva Nord, splitting the sections behind each goal in two. Both sets of ultras continued their protests for the rest of the season, including during Roma's 4–1 victory in the return fixture. Lazio's ultras returned to the Curva Nord for Roma's 1–4 victory in December 2016, but the Roma ultras continue to boycott matches.

The most known club anthem is "Roma (non-si discute, si ama)", also known as "Roma Roma", by singer Antonello Venditti. The title roughly means, "Roma is not to be questioned, it is to be loved," and it is sung before each match. The song "Grazie Roma", by the same singer, is played at the end of victorious home matches. Recently, the main riff of The White Stripes' song "Seven Nation Army" has also become widely popular at matches.

Rivalries
In Italian football, Roma is a club with many rivalries; first and foremost is their rivalry with Lazio, the club with whom they share the Stadio Olimpico. The derby between the two is called the Derby della Capitale, it is amongst the most heated and emotional footballing rivalries in the world. The fixture has seen some occasional instances of violence in the past, including the death of Lazio fan Vincenzo Paparelli in 1979–80 as a result of an emergency flare fired from the Curva Sud, and the abandonment of a match in March 2004 following unfounded rumours of a fatality which led to violence outside the stadium.

Against Napoli, Roma also compete in the Derby del Sole, meaning the "Derby of the Sun". Nowadays, fans also consider other Juventus (a rivalry born especially in the 1980s), Milan, Atalanta (since 1984, when friendly relations between the two clubs' ultras deteriorated), and Internazionale (increased in recent years) among their rivals, as they are often competitors for the top four spots in the league table and qualification for the UEFA Champions League.

Hooliganism
Rivalries with other teams have escalated into serious violence. A group of ultras who label themselves the Fedayn — 'the devotees' — after a group of long-forgotten Iranian guerrilla fighters are regarded to be responsible for the organised hooliganism. In 2014 Daniele De Santis, a Roma ultra, was convicted of shooting Ciro Esposito and two others during clashes with Napoli fans who were in Rome for their club's Coppa Italia final against Fiorentina. Esposito died of his wounds. De Santis was sentenced to 26 years in prison, later reduced to 16 years on appeal. Roma ultras have displayed banners celebrating De Santis.

There have been multiple instances of Roma ultras attacking supporters of foreign clubs when playing in Rome. These attacks have regularly featured the Roma ultras using knives, poles, flares, bottles and stones on unarmed foreign supporters, resulting in multiple hospitalisations. Home games against Liverpool in 1984 and 2001, Middlesbrough in 2006, Manchester United in 2007, Arsenal in 2009, Tottenham Hotspur in 2012, and Chelsea in 2017 have all resulted in multiple stabbings and other injuries to foreign supporters. In 2018 Roma ultras travelling to an away game at Liverpool attacked home supporters, resulting in a home supporter being critically injured.

Players

Current squad

Primavera squad

Other players under contract

Out on loan

Women team

Notable players

Retired numbers

Since 2017, Roma have not issued the squad number 10 to commemorate Totti, who was retired from football since 2017. It was going issued to Paulo Dybala in 2022, but Dybala choosed the number 21 instead of number 10.

Management staff

Chairmen history

Roma have had numerous chairmen ( or ) over the course of their history, some of which have been the owners and co-owners of the club, some of them were nominated by the owners. Franco Sensi was the chairman until his death in 2008, with his daughter, Roma CEO Rosella Sensi taking his place as chairman. Here is a complete list of Roma chairmen from 1927 until the present day.

Managerial history

Roma have had many managers and trainers running the team during their history, here is a chronological list of them from 1927 onwards.

Honours

National titles
Serie A
 Winners (3): 1941–42, 1982–83, 2000–01

Coppa Italia
 Winners (9): 1963–64, 1968–69, 1979–80, 1980–81, 1983–84, 1985–86, 1990–91, 2006–07, 2007–08

Supercoppa Italiana
 Winners (2): 2001, 2007

European titles

UEFA Europa Conference League
 Winners (1): 2021–22

Inter-Cities Fairs Cup
 Winners (1): 1960–61

Other titles
Serie B
 Winners (1): 1951–52

Anglo-Italian Cup
 Winners (1): 1972

Hall of Fame
On 7 October 2012, the A.S. Roma Hall of Fame was announced.
The Hall of Fame players were voted via the club's official website and a special Hall of Fame panel. In 2013 four players were voted in. In 2014, the third year of AS Roma Hall of Fame four more players were voted in.

Added in 2012:
  Franco Tancredi (1977–90)
  Cafu (1997–03)
  Giacomo Losi (1954–69)
  Aldair (1990-03)
  Francesco Rocca (1972–81)
  Fulvio Bernardini (1928–39)
  Agostino Di Bartolomei (1972–75; 1976–84)
  Falcão (1980–85)
  Bruno Conti (1973–75; 1976–78; 1979–91)
  Roberto Pruzzo (1978–88)
  Amedeo Amadei (1936–38; 1939–48)

Added in 2013:
  Attilio Ferraris  (1927–34; 1938–39)
  Sebino Nela (1981–92)
  Giuseppe Giannini (1981–96)
  Vincenzo Montella (1999–2009)

Added in 2014:
  Alcides Ghiggia (1953–61)
  Carlo Ancelotti (1979–87)
  Rudi Völler (1987–92)
  Vincent Candela (1997–2005)

Added in 2015:
  Guido Masetti (1930–43)
  Sergio Santarini (1968–81)
  Damiano Tommasi (1996–2006)
  Gabriel Batistuta (2000–03)

Added in 2016:
  Giorgio Carpi (1927–37)
  Toninho Cerezo (1983–86)
  Giancarlo De Sisti (1960–65; 1974–79)
  Arcadio Venturi (1948–57)

Added in 2017:
  Francesco Totti (1992–2017)

Added in 2018:
  Mario De Micheli (1927–1932)
  Giuliano Taccola (1967–1969)
  Rodolfo Volk (1928–1933)

Club records and statistics

Francesco Totti currently holds Roma's official appearance record, having made 786 appearances in all competitions, over the course of 25 seasons from 1993 until 2017. He also holds the record for Serie A appearances with 619, as he passed Giacomo Losi on 1 March 2008 during a home match against Parma.

Including all competitions, Totti is the all-time leading goalscorer for Roma with 307 goals since joining the club, 250 of which were scored in Serie A (another Roma record). Roberto Pruzzo, who was the all-time topscorer since 1988, comes in second in all competitions with 138. In 1930–31, Rodolfo Volk scored 29 goals in Serie A over the course of a single season. Not only was Volk the league's top scorer that year, he also set a Roma record for most goals scored in a season which would later be matched by Edin Džeko in 2016–17.

Its major founders Fortitudo and Alba having been relegated at the end of 1926–27 campaign, new-founded Roma had to take part to Southern First Division championship (Serie B) for its inaugural season. Nevertheless, the FIGC decided on a special enlargement of first level division re-admitting AS Roma and SSC Napoli. The first ever official matches participated in by Roma was in the National Division, the predecessor of Serie A, of 1927–28, against Livorno, a 2–0 Roma win. The biggest ever victory recorded by Roma was 9–0 against Cremonese during the 1929–30 Serie A season. The heaviest defeat Roma have ever suffered is 1–7, which has occurred five times; against Juventus in 1931–32, Torino in 1947–48, Manchester United in 2006–07, Bayern Munich in 2014–15 and Fiorentina in 2018–19.

Divisional movements

UEFA club coefficient ranking

As a company

Since 1999, during Franco Sensi's period in charge, Associazione Sportiva Roma has been a listed Società per azioni on Borsa Italiana. From 2004 to 2011, Roma's shares are distributed between; 67.1% to Compagnia Italpetroli SpA (the Sensi family holding; Banca di Roma later acquired 49% stake on Italpetroli due to debt restructuring) and 32.9% to other public shareholders.

Along with Lazio and Juventus, Roma is one of only three quotated Italian clubs. According to The Football Money League published by consultants Deloitte, in the 2010–11 season, Roma was the 15th highest-earning football club in the world with an estimated revenue of €143.5 million.

In April 2008, after months of speculation, George Soros was confirmed by Rosella Sensi, CEO of Serie A club A.S. Roma, to be bidding for a takeover. The takeover bid was successively rejected by the Sensi family, who instead preferred to maintain the club's ownership. On 17 August 2008 club chairman and owner Franco Sensi died after a long illness; his place at the chairmanship of the club was successively taken by his daughter Rosella.

Since the takeover in 2011, NEEP Roma Holding S.p.A. has owned all shares Sensi previously hold. NEEP, itself a joint venture, was held by DiBenedetto AS Roma LLC (later renamed to AS Roma SPV, LLC) and Unicredit in 60–40 ratio from 2011 to 2013, which the former had four real person shareholders in equal ratio, led by future Roma president Thomas R. DiBenedetto (2011–12). The takeover also activated a mandatory bid of shares from the general public, however not all minority shareholders were willing to sell their shares. The mandatory bid meant NEEP held 78.038% of shares of AS Roma (increased from 67.1% of the Sensi). On 1 August 2013, the president of Roma as well as one of the four American shareholders of AS Roma SPV, LLC, James Pallotta, bought an additional 9% shares of NEEP Roma Holding from Unicredit (through Raptor Holdco LLC), as the bank was not willing to fully participate in the capital increase of NEEP from €120,000 to €160,008,905 (excluding share premium). On 4 April 2014 Starwood Capital Group also became the fifth shareholder of AS Roma SPV, as well as forming a strategic partnership with AS Roma SpA to develop real estate around the new stadium. The private investment firm was represented by Zsolt Kohalmi in AS Roma SPV, who was appointed on 4 April as a partner and head of European acquisitions of the firm. On 11 August 2014, UniCredit sold the remain shares on NEEP (of 31%) for €33 million which meant AS Roma SPV LLC (91%) and Raptor Holdco LLC (9%) were the sole intermediate holding company of AS Roma SpA.

Since re-capitalization in 2003–04, Roma had a short-lived financial self-sustainability, until the takeover in 2011. The club had set up a special amortisation fund using Articolo 18-bis Legge 91/1981 mainly for the abnormal signings prior 2002–03 season, (such as Davide Bombardini for €11 million account value in June 2002, when the flopped player exchange boosted 2001–02 season result) and the tax payment of 2002–03 was rescheduled. In 2004–05, Roma made a net profit of €10,091,689 and followed by €804,285 in 2005–06. In 2006–07 season the accounting method changed to IFRS, which meant that the 2005–06 result was reclassified as net loss of €4,051,905 and 2006–07 season was net income of €10,135,539 (€14.011 million as a group). Moreover, the special fund (€80,189,123) was removed from the asset and co-currently for the equity as scheduled, meant Roma group had a negative equity of €8.795 million on 30 June 2007. Nevertheless, the club had sold the brand to a subsidiary which boost the profit in a separate financial statement, which La Repubblica described as "doping". In 2007–08, Roma made a net income of €18,699,219. (€19 million as a group) However, 2008–09 saw the decrease of gate and TV income, co-currently with finishing sixth in Serie A, which saw Roma make a net loss of €1,894,330. (€1.56 million as a group) The gate and TV income further slipped in 2009–10 with a net loss of €21,917,292 (already boosted by the sale of Alberto Aquilani; €22 million as a group) despite sporting success (finishing in second place in 2009–10). Moreover, despite a positive equity as a separate company (€105,142,589), the AS Roma Group had a negative equity on the consolidated balance sheet, and fell from +€8.8 million to −€13.2 million. In the 2010–11 season, Roma was administrated by UniCredit as the Sensi family failed to repay the bank and the club was put on the market, and were expected to have a quiet transfer window. Concurrently with no selling profit on the players, Roma's net loss rose to €30,589,137 (€30.778 million as a group) and the new owner already planned a re-capitalization after the mandatory bid on the shares. On the positive side, TV income was increased from €75,150,744 to €78,041,642, and gate income increased from €23,821,218 to €31,017,179. This was because Roma entered 2010–11 Champions League, which counter-weighed the effect of the new collective agreement of Serie A. In 2011–12, the renewal of squad and participation in 2011–12 UEFA Europa League had worsened the financial result, which the €50 million capital increase (in advance) was counter-weighted totally by the net loss. In the 2012–13 season, the participation in domestic league only, was not only not harmful to the revenue but increase in gate income as well as decrease in wage bill, however Roma still did not yet break even (€40.130 million net loss in consolidated accounts). NEEP Roma also re-capitalized AS Roma in advance for another €26,550,000 during 2012–13. A proposed capital increase by €100 million for Roma was announced on 25 June 2014; however, until 22 May 2014, NEEP already injected €108 million into the club, which depends on public subscription; more than €8 million would convert to medium-long-term loan from shareholder instead of becoming share capital. Another capital increase was carried in 2018.

A joint venture of Roma, which was owned by Roma (37.5%), S.S. Lazio (37.5%) and Parma F.C.(25%), Società Diritti Sportivi S.r.l., was in the process of liquidation since 2005. The company was a joint-venture of four football clubs, including Fiorentina. After the bankruptcy of Fiorentina however, both Roma and Lazio had increased their shares ratio from 25% to 37.5%. Another subsidiary, "Soccer S.A.S. di Brand Management S.r.l.", was a special-purpose entity (SPV) that Roma sold their brand to the subsidiary in 2007. In February 2015, another SPV, "ASR Media and Sponsorship S.r.l", was set up to secure a five-year bank loan of €175 million from Goldman Sachs, for three-month Euribor (min. 0.75%) + 6.25% spread (i.e. min. 7% interests rate p.a.).

In 2015, Inter and Roma were the only two Italian clubs that were sanctioned by UEFA for breaking UEFA Financial Fair Play Regulations, which they signed settlement agreements with UEFA. It was followed by Milan in 2018.

Roma had compliance with the requirements and overall objective of the settlement agreement in 2018, which the club exited from settlement regime.

Superleague Formula

A.S. Roma had a team in the Superleague Formula race car series where teams were sponsored by football clubs. Roma's driver was ex-IndyCar Series driver Franck Perera. The team had posted three podiums and was operated by Alan Docking Racing.

See also

 Football in Italy
 European Club Association

Footnotes

References

External links

 
 A.S. Roma  at Serie A 
 A.S. Roma at UEFA
 A.S. Roma at FIFA

 
Football clubs in Italy
Football clubs in Rome
Association football clubs established in 1927
Italian football First Division clubs
Publicly traded sports companies
Coppa Italia winning clubs
Serie A winning clubs
Serie A clubs
Serie B clubs
1927 establishments in Italy
Multi-sport clubs in Italy
UEFA Europa Conference League winning clubs
R
Companies listed on the Borsa Italiana